Koznik Castle is a medieval castle in central Serbia, 10 km northwest from the present day town of Brus, on a hillside of mountain Kopaonik, on the right bank in the upper flow of river Rasina. The castle was built on top of a steep hill dominating the surrounding terrain on 920 m altitude.

History 
The castle was mentioned for the first time in a decree of Prince Lazar. In the early 15th century, Koznik belonged to Grand Čelnik Radič, one of the most important knights at that time. Lazar's widow, Princess Milica spent some time there, in 1402, while their son, despot Stefan Lazarević, made two decrees in Koznik in 1405, granting Radič Postupović all surrounding villages and the church on the river Grabovničica.

After a brief Ottoman conquest of Koznik, the castle returned to despot Đurađ Branković in 1444. The Ottomans again seized the castle at same time when they conquered Kruševac in 1454–1455. During 16th and 17th century, an Ottoman squad was located there until 1689, when Koznik was taken hold of by Serbian rebels, which indicates that, at the time, Koznik was still an active fortification.

Koznik is an example of a small highland fortified castle. It has an irregular polygonal base that follows the configuration of the terrain. South from the fort were other constructions, with some remnants still recognizable today.

Koznik Fortress was declared Monument of Culture of Great Importance in 1979, and it is protected by Republic of Serbia.

Gallery

See also 
 Monuments of Culture of Great Importance
 Tourism in Serbia
 Cultural Monuments of Rasina District
 Stalać Fortress

References 

Forts in Serbia
Ruins in Serbia
Rasina District
Medieval Serbian architecture
Cultural Monuments of Great Importance (Serbia)
Medieval sites in Serbia